Survivor South Africa: Champions is the fifth season of the South African reality competition show Survivor South Africa. The series was filmed in October 2013 and aired weekly between January and May 2014 on M-Net. This was the second season to be filmed in Johor state of Malaysia, following Survivor South Africa: Malaysia, and the third to be hosted by Nico Panagio.

This season featured 20 contestants being led by two of South Africa's sporting champions while competing for 27 days. The champions joining the 20 contestants were former Springbok rugby captain Corné Krige and former Bafana Bafana player Mark Fish. As tribe captains, they drafted the two initial tribes, competed in all the team challenges pre-merge, involved themselves in tribal life, and attended Tribal Council. However, they could not vote or be voted for at Tribal Council. Once the tribes merged, the Champions were removed from the islands and placed on the jury, where they must compete in duels for the Salvation Cup, which the winning captain can use to negate a single vote at Tribal Council. The captains attended the final Tribal Council and cast a vote for the Ultimate Survivor. The champions also competed for a separate prize of R 500,000 Rand, as decided by a vote from the South African viewing audience.

On May 18, 2014, Graham Jenneker was voted the "Ultimate Survivor" in a 5-3-2 jury vote over runner-up Buhle Madlala and 2nd runner-up Sivu Xabanisa. It was also announced that Corné Krige was the winning captain after eight weeks of public voting.

Contestants

The cast is composed of 20 players, initially divided into two tribes of ten in a schoolyard pick by the champions: Selatan (South in Malay), led by Corné Krige, and Utara (North in Malay), led by Mark Fish. On Day 12, the castaways participated in a surprise tribe swap. On Day 18, the two tribes merged into one tribe Juara, named after the Malay language word of Champions.

Future appearances
Killarney Jones, Marian de Vos, Philip Dickson, Shane Hattingh and Shona MacDonald returned to compete again in Survivor South Africa: Return of the Outcasts in 2022. MacDonald finished in 15th place, while Hattingh, de Vos, Dickson and Jones finished 2nd, 3rd, 4th and 5th respectively.

Champions

Alongside the support of Krige and Fish, the tribes could win additional challenge assistants: South African sporting legends and personalities Jimmy Tau, Makhaya Ntini, Jonty Rhodes, Carol Tshabalala and Derek Alberts.

Season summary

The 20 new castaways were divided into two tribes via schoolyard pick by captains Corné Krige and Mark Fish: Selatan and Utara. Corné and Mark respectively joined Selatan and Utara to assist in camp life and challenges, but without the power to vote at Tribal Council. At Selatan, Corné struggled against a Rugrats alliance (led by Graham, Altaaf, Gena, and Moyra) who voted against his suggestions, while Mark sat back and let Utara play their strategic game without his interference. After a tribe shuffle, Selatan went on an immunity run, which protected the former Utara minority of Buhle, Solly, and Vel until the merge. Shane and Marian kept a strong hold on the new Utara tribe, voting out two of their own allies and stealing an idol in the process.

When the two tribes merged, the captains were removed from the camp life to compete in Salvation Cup duels. The winning captain at these duels would be able to nullify a vote at Tribal Council for any player before the vote is revealed. The merge saw the Rugrats controlling the votes over two warring Utara factions, but as the Rugrats grew complacent, their leader Graham led a series of short-term voting blocs to blindside his own allies and both Utara factions until there were five players remaining.

The final five saw Graham's control of the strategic game be pulled away from him as he and remaining Selatan members, Zavion and David, were blindsided with a successful bluff and idol play by Buhle and Sivu. Buhle also controlled the final four vote in an unsuccessful blindside of Sivu before the Final Tribal Council. The jury criticized all three finalists: Graham, for his betrayal of the Rugrats and mistakes that led to Buhle and Sivu taking control towards the end of the game; Buhle, for her under-the-radar "anyone but me" social game; and Sivu, for letting his unwavering loyalties to Shane and Marian and his general immaturity affect his social game. However, alongside the captains' votes between him and Buhle, Graham managed to earn a 5-3-2 victory over runner-up Buhle, and second runner-up Sivu. Throughout the season, the viewers in South Africa was encouraged to vote between Corné and Mark for who was the better captain, with Corné winning a separate grand prize alongside his Selatan protégé, Graham.

Episodes

Voting history

References

External links
Official Website

2014 South African television seasons
Survivor South Africa seasons
Television shows filmed in Malaysia